Lullabies for You, also known as Toshiko's Lullabies (トシコの子守唄), is a jazz album of lullabies and children's songs featuring Toshiko Akiyoshi's piano in a trio setting. It was originally released in Japan in 1965 by Nippon Columbia Records.

Track listing
LP Side 'A'
"MARI TO TONOSAMA" (Nakayama) – 4:30
"Children in the Temple Ground" – 3:48
"Three Blind Mice" – 3:20
"Cancion De Extremadura" – 2:16
"I KEN PIEN TAN" – 3:19
"The March" (Saifiddinov) – 3:35
LP Side 'B'
"Angel's Lullaby" – 3:37
"Frère Jacques" – 2:33
"CHŌCHŌ" – 2:32
"London Bridge" – 3:08
"TUPPEN OCH HONAN" – 3:38
"Lullaby For You" (Akiyoshi) – 3:24
All arrangements by Akiyoshi.  All compositions are traditional except as indicated.

Personnel
Toshiko Mariano aka Toshiko Akiyoshi – piano
Yasuo Arakawa – bass
Kanji Harada – drums

References
 Nippon Columbia SW-7056
Lullabies for You at Nippon Columbia Records

External links
Album review at jazzloft.com

Toshiko Akiyoshi albums
1965 albums
Nippon Columbia albums